María del Pilar Peña Carrasco (born 4 April 1986), commonly known as Pili Peña, is a Spanish female water polo player.

She was born in Madrid, and played for Club Natación Ondarreta Alcorcón, who won the Spanish championship in 2006, and the Spanish cup in 2006 and 2007.  At the 2012 Summer Olympics, she won a silver medal competing for the Spain women's national water polo team in the women's event. She is 5 ft 7.5 inches tall. She now plays for the Spanish club CN Sabadell, with whom she won the Spanish championship in 2011, 2012 and 2013.

See also
 List of Olympic medalists in water polo (women)
 List of world champions in women's water polo
 List of World Aquatics Championships medalists in water polo

References

External links
 

1986 births
Living people
Sportspeople from Madrid
Spanish female water polo players
Water polo drivers
Left-handed water polo players
Water polo players at the 2012 Summer Olympics
Water polo players at the 2016 Summer Olympics
Water polo players at the 2020 Summer Olympics
Medalists at the 2012 Summer Olympics
Olympic silver medalists for Spain in water polo
World Aquatics Championships medalists in water polo
Medalists at the 2020 Summer Olympics
Water polo players from the Community of Madrid
21st-century Spanish women